Rio Teramoto (寺本莉緒, Teramoto Rio, born 5 November 2001) is a Japanese Gravure idol and actress from Hiroshima. She is represented by Les Pros Entertainment.

Early life and family
Teramoto did her first modeling as a child, saying it inspired her to continuing pursuing it as a career. She began dancing at 3 years old and playing piano at 5. She has two older brothers.

Career and biography
After the "Dream Girl Audition 2015" competition, Teramoto was signed to the LesProsEntertainment talent agency. She worked promoting other performers at the 2016 Tokyo Idol Festival. In 2017, Teramoto worked on a various theatrical productions, including a role in Fiddler on the Roof. In 2018, she entered the "Miss Magazine" contest, which was revived for the first time in 7 years, taking the runner-up "Miss Young Magazine" title while being called "The Treasure of the Next Generation of Weekly Young Magazine." Along with the other nine contest finalist, Teramoto formed the Miss Magazine Theater Company, putting on a stage version of the popular manga Are You Lost? for which she cut her hair.

Teramoto attended AICJ Junior High school and High School in Hiroshima for much of her education but decided to transfer schools and move to Tokyo for career. She did appear in a 2019 episode of the television show Toi to Ai toka (恋とか愛とか（仮）) filmed at the school before her departure. That same year, a private swimsuit photo of Teramoto posted to social media went viral, attracting attention in Japan and abroad and dramatically raising her online profile. The attention earned her first of many appearances in Weekly Playboy.

On 1 March 2020, her first photo book, Curiosity, was released, the same month she graduated high school. The photo shoots were done in Los Angeles, Teramoto's first visit to the United States. Teramoto said, "[The book] was completely self-produced, and I made it with particular attention to costumes, makeup, and how it looks!" The book was the number one book in the "Women's Talent Photobook Sales Ranking" by the end of the month and had already exceeded four reprints by July of that year. She entered college in April 2020 but has yet to attend classes due to the COVID-19 pandemic.

Teramoto is a baseball fan and supporter of the Hiroshima Toyo Carp, saying in an interview that Ryosuke Kikuchi is her favorite player. She eats up to 15 cups of ramen a week. Her nominal measurements according to her official profile are 88G-60-88 cm (35G-24-35 in).

References

Japanese gravure idols
Japanese actresses
People from Hiroshima
2001 births
Living people